Thumindu Dodantenna (තුමිඳු දොඩම්තැන්න) is an actor in Sri Lankan cinema, theater and television. He is also a lecturer, screenwriter by profession. He graduated with an M.A in Drama and Theater from the University of Kelaniya, and is now a lecturer in the Department of Performing Arts at Sripalee Campus in Horana. He is considered one of five actors who have dominated the Sri Lankan Stage by critics.

Filmography 
Dodantenna started his film career with  Sankara in 2007, directed by Prasanna Jayakody. In the upcoming film "Nidahase Piya DS" he plays the lead role of young DS Senanayake.

Theater 
 Ashawe Veedi Riya (translated and directed by Champa Buddhipala], “A Streetcar Named Desire” written by Tennessee Williams) role as “ Mitch“ (Harold Mitchell); performed in Melbourne & Sydney, Australia in October 2019
 Janelayen Paninnada – Danushika Nayana Kumari – Academic Players team – Script by Thumindu Dodamthenna
 Arundathi – Thumindu Dodanthenna
 Dolahak – Athula Pathirana
 Adara Wasthuwa – Rajitha Dissanayake

Television serials
 Koombiyo (2017–18) – Jehan Fernando
 Pinibara Yamaya (2010)
 Sahodaraya (2018–19) as Rajiva
 9 weni kadulla (2016)

Awards 
 Raigam Tele'es Most Popular Actor Award of the year 2017.
 Signis Award for the Best Actor in 2019.

References

External links
 Thumindu Dodantenna on IMDb
 Kalani Dodantenna on IMDb
 Asanka Dodantenna on IMDb
විශ්වවිද්‍යාලයකින් එන ප්‍රථම වෘත්තාන්ත චිත්‍රපටය

Living people
Sri Lankan male film actors
Sinhalese male actors
Sri Lankan male television actors
Sri Lankan male stage actors
Year of birth missing (living people)